The Vijay for Best Editor is given by STAR Vijay as part of its annual Vijay Awards ceremony for Tamil  (Kollywood) films.

The list
Here is a list of the award winners and the films for which they won.

Nominations 
2007 A. Sreekar Prasad - Katrathu Tamil
Anthony - Sivaji
Kasi Viswanathan - Mozhi
Praveen K. L. & N. B. Srikanth - Chennai 600028
Raja Mohammad - Paruthiveeran
2008 Raja Mohammad - Subramaniapuram
Anthony - Vaaranam Aayiram
Madhan Gunadev - Poo
Sadagopan Ramesh - Anjathey
2009 A. Sreekar Prasad - Yavarum Nalam
Anthony - Renigunta
Arun Kumar - Kanchivaram 
Kishore Te. - Eeram
A. L. Ramesh - Naadodigal
2010 Kasi Viswanathan - Naan Mahaan Alla
Anthony - Vinnaithaandi Varuvaayaa
LVK Dass - Mynaa
A. Sreekar Prasad - Angadi Theru
V. T. Vijayan - Singam
 2011 Kishore Te. - Engeyum Eppodhum
 Anthony - Ko
 Praveen K. L. & N. B. Srikanth - Aaranya Kaandam
 Raja Mohammad - Mounaguru
 Gagin - Yuddham Sei
 2012 Kotagiri Venkateswara Rao - Naan Ee
A. Sreekar Prasad  - Thuppakki
Gopi Krishna - Vazhakku Enn 18/9
Leo John Paul - Pizza
Praveen K. L.-N. B. Srikanth - Thadaiyara Thaakka
 2013 Anthony - Pandiya Naadu
 Anthony L. Ruben - Raja Rani
 Gopinath - Onaayum Aattukkuttiyum
 Leo John Paul - Soodhu Kavvum
 Mahesh Narayanan - Vishwaroopam
 2014 Vivek Harshan - Jigarthanda
Anthony - Goli Soda
Kishore Te - Nedunchaalai
Praveen K. L. - Madras
V. J. Sabu Joseph - Vallinam

See also
 Tamil cinema
 Cinema of India

References

Editor
Film editing awards